Cho Tae-yong (born 1956) is a South Korean career diplomat with over three decades of experience who has served as South Korea's Deputy National Security Advisor since October 2015.

Cho has extensive experience in a range of high-level diplomatic assignments dealing with the United States and North Korea.  In November 2016, he represented South Korea in talks with Michael Flynn and other members of then-U.S. President-elect Donald Trump's foreign policy team on North Korea.  He and then-U.S. Deputy Secretary of State Tony Blinken held five rounds of U.S.-South Korea strategic consultations on North Korea between 2015 and 2017.  As South Korea's First Vice Foreign Minister between 2014 and 2015, he represented South Korea in regular U.S.-South Korea-Japan trilateral talks with U.S. Deputy Secretary of State Tony Blinken and Japanese Vice Foreign Minister Shinsuke Sugiyama.

He is not to be confused with Cho Tae-yul, a similarly named South Korean career diplomat who was South Korea's Second Vice Foreign Minister of Affairs until 2016 and currently serves as the Permanent Representative of the Republic of Korea to the United Nations.

Early life
Cho was born in Seoul in 1956, and received his bachelor's degree in political science from Seoul National University.

Career
He was previously South Korea's First Vice Foreign Minister of Foreign Affairs from 2014 to 2015 and South Korea's Special Representative for Korean Peninsula Peace and Security Affairs from 2013 to 2014.

Cho has been working on North Korean affairs since 2004. He was Director General of the South Korean foreign ministry's Task Force on North Korea, and deputy head of the South Korean delegation to the six-party talks in Beijing in 2004. He was named South Korea's special representative for Korean Peninsula peace and security affairs in 2013, and then became Vice-Minister of Foreign Affairs in 2014.

See also
Politics of South Korea
Foreign relations of South Korea
List of Koreans

References

1956 births
Living people
People from Seoul
Seoul National University alumni
South Korean diplomats
Ambassadors of South Korea to Ireland
Ambassadors of South Korea to Australia
Ambassadors of South Korea to the United States